"Where Did You Get That Hat?" is a comic song which was composed and first performed by Joseph J. Sullivan at Miner's Eighth Avenue Theatre in 1888.  It was a great success and has since been performed by many others including J. C. Heffron, Stanley Holloway, Al Simmons
and Dave Barnes. The song is now also a very popular piece performed for musical theatre exams (grades 4 to 8) and music hall concerts.

Bing Crosby included the song in a medley on his album 101 Gang Songs (1961).

A broadside ballad  in the Bodleian library indicates that this song was written by James Ralmaz (rather than Joseph Sullivan) and performed by J. C. Heffron.

References

1888 songs
Comedy songs
Novelty songs
Vaudeville songs